cis-1,2-Bis(diphenylphosphino)ethylene (dppv) is an organophosphorus compound with the formula C2H2(PPh2)2 (Ph = C6H5).  Both the cis and trans isomers are known, but the cis isomer is of primary interest. Classified as a diphosphine ligand, it is a bidentate ligand in coordination chemistry.  For example it gives rise to the complex Ni(dppv)2 and the coordination polymer [Ni(dppv)]n.  As a chelating ligand, dppv is very similar to 1,2-bis(diphenylphosphino)benzene.

The diphosphine is prepared by reaction of lithium diphenylphosphide with cis-dichloroethylene.
2LiPPh2  +  C2H2Cl2  →  C2H2(PPh2)2  +  2LiCl

trans-1,2-Bis(diphenylphosphino)ethylene is made similarly, but using trans-dichloroethylene.

References

Chelating agents
Diphosphines
Phenyl compounds